The Prescott Pusher is an American, four-seat, pusher configuration homebuilt aircraft, with a large cockpit, retractable or fixed gear and a T-tail. The pilot and passengers enter the aircraft through a large left-side clamshell door.

Design and development
Tom Prescott worked for Sikorsky Aircraft, Piper Aircraft, and Learjet. He left Learjet in 1983 to produce the Prescott Pusher. It was tested using a 1/5 scale model in the Wichita State University wind tunnel in 1983. Flying scale models were tested in 1984, which led to the development of the drooped wing tips for better low speed handling and reduced drag. The aircraft was modeled using CAD/CAM software for creating drawings and defining machine cuts on the fuselage steel, becoming the first CAD/CAM designed homebuilt aircraft. The AVIA Products Co was purchased to develop an electrically controlled variable pitch fiberglass pusher propeller.

The pusher was designed to FAR Part 23 certification standards of the time. It uses aluminum construction for the wings and tail surfaces. The fiberglass landing gear and flaps are hydraulically activated. The nosegear steering is also hydraulic with electric controls. The fuselage uses a 4130 steel welded square steel tube frame with composite skin covering. Every component can be installed prior to skin installation, and in theory, could even be flown without the skins. The wing skins are formed cold using dry ice, then age hardened to T-42 standards. The engine is mounted far aft with a 12-inch propeller extension.

Operational history
The Prescott Pusher was first displayed at the Experimental Aircraft Association airshow in Oshkosh, Wisconsin, in 1985. Prescott Aeronautical Corporation went out of business. In 1991, there were approximately 25–35 builders completing their aircraft in various configurations.

Aircraft on display
Kansas Aviation Museum

Specifications

References

External links

Pusher
1980s United States sport aircraft
Single-engined pusher aircraft
Low-wing aircraft
Homebuilt aircraft
T-tail aircraft
Aircraft first flown in 1985